Jorge Lozano and Todd Witsken were the defending champions, but lost in the quarterfinals this year.

Guy Forget and Jakob Hlasek won the title, defeating John Fitzgerald and Anders Järryd 6–4, 6–2 in the final.

Seeds
All eight seeded teams received byes to the second round.

Draw

Finals

Top half

Bottom half

External links
 1990 Stockholm Open Doubles draw

Doubles